Ryan Harrison (born May 7, 1992) is an American professional tennis player. Harrison has won one career ATP title in singles at the 2017 Memphis Open to go along with four in doubles, including the 2017 French Open.

Before turning 16, Harrison was regarded a prodigy after cracking the top 10 in the junior rankings and becoming one of the youngest players ever to win an ATP match. Although he broke through onto the ATP level by the age of 20, Harrison then fell out of the top 100 for several years. He since returned to the top 100 in 2016 after a strong second half of the season that included multiple wins over opponents ranked in the top 20 and his first career appearance in the round of 32 at a Grand Slam. Harrison built on that momentum in 2017 to reach a top-40 career-high ranking in singles after winning his first career ATP title.

Personal life
Harrison began playing tennis at age 2 and was coached by his father, Pat Harrison, who had a brief career as a professional, playing predominantly Challenger and Futures events. Harrison is an alumnus of IMG Academy and is currently coached by USTA. He is currently signed with IMG Academy.

Harrison has a younger brother Christian, who currently plays tennis on the ATP Challenger Tour. Christian joined Ryan to play doubles at the 2012 US Open, where they reached the quarterfinals. He also has a younger sister named Madison who played at Mississippi State University.
On March 5, 2016, Ryan Harrison announced his engagement to Lauren McHale, the sister of fellow tennis player Christina McHale. Harrison married Lauren McHale in April of the following year in Austin, Texas. The couple has since divorced.

Junior career
As a junior, Harrison compiled a 60–24 win–loss record in singles, reaching as high as No. 7 in the world (achieved in April 2008).

Junior Slam results:

Australian Open: SF (2008)
French Open: 3R (2008)
Wimbledon: 2R (2008)
US Open: 3R (2008)

Before he went on the junior circuit, Ryan trained at the John Newcombe Tennis Ranch in New Braunfels, Texas. His first junior Grand Slam was the 2007 US Open, where as a wildcard, at the age of 15, he lost in the first round to a qualifier. Going into the next Grand Slam, the 2008 Australian Open, he was seeded fourth, and lost to Yang Tsung-hua in the semifinals. Harrison failed to produce in the next three Grand Slams, losing in the third round of the 2008 French Open, the second round in 2008 Wimbledon, and the third round in the 2008 US Open, a competition in which his younger brother Christian also competed. Although at this point Harrison was only 16, and as such was eligible to play juniors for another two years, it would be his final junior Grand slam.

Tennis career

2007-2008: Early years
Harrison is notable for being the third-youngest player since 1990, after Richard Gasquet and Rafael Nadal, to have won an ATP level match, defeating world no. 130 Pablo Cuevas in the 2008 U.S. Men's Clay Court Championships. Entering the tournament as a qualifier ranked no. 1000, he was only the tenth player in the history of the ATP Tour to have won a match before turning 16. This puts Harrison among an elite group and makes him the youngest American to accomplish this feat since Michael Chang. Harrison played mainly futures tournaments in order to increase his ranking. Harrison competed in the qualifying tournament for the 2008 Cincinnati Masters, and the 2008 US Open, but lost in the first round in both. Harrison would finish 2008 ranked no. 742 in singles.

2009
Harrison did not compete in any tournaments until late April in 2009. As a wildcard, he made it to the quarterfinals of a Challenger tournament in Sarasota. In June, Harrison would win his first futures title, defeating another rising star Filip Krajinović in the final. Having not defended the points from the Clay Court Championships, these points took Harrison's ranking to 706. Harrison would again try his luck in both the Cincinnati and US Open qualifying, and once again lost in the first round in both. After this, Harrison went to two consecutive Futures finals, losing the first to Michael McClune, and winning the second against Richard Bloomfield. This would put Harrison's ranking at 371 in the world. Directly after that final, Harrison made it to the semifinals of a Challenger tournament in Sacramento, losing to Jesse Levine. Harrison finished the year ranked no. 364.

2010
Harrison played in a playoff against other Americans to decide who would receive America's wildcard into the 2010 Australian Open. Harrison defeated Alex Kuznetsov and Donald Young in two sets before defeating Jesse Levine in three straight sets. Once in the draw, Harrison lost in the first round to Janko Tipsarević in straight sets.

At this point, Harrison began competing in some bigger tournaments. First he received a wildcard into the 2010 SAP Open, where he lost to eventual semifinalist Denis Istomin in the first round. Next, Harrison went through qualifying to face John Isner in the first round of the 2010 Regions Morgan Keegan Championships. Harrison lost in straight sets to the eventual finalist. Afterwards, Harrison went through qualifying in the 2010 Delray Beach International Tennis Championships, before losing to eventual champion Ernests Gulbis in the first round.

Harrison received a wildcard for the 2010 BNP Paribas Open, where he defeated Taylor Dent in the first round, before losing to the eventual winner Ivan Ljubičić. Having lost early, Harrison competed in the BMW Tennis Championship, where he lost in the first round. After receiving another wildcard into the 2010 Sony Ericsson Open, he lost in the first round to Michaël Llodra. Harrison played in a few Challengers afterwards without any major results.

In May, now ranked no. 263 in the world, Harrison entered the qualifying tournament for the 2010 French Open, after having lost in the final of the US Wildcard Playoff to Ryan Sweeting. Harrison lost in the final round of qualifying to Stefano Galvani. Harrison competed in the prestigious Queen's Championship, but lost in the first round to Jesse Levine. Next, Harrison competed in Wimbledon qualifying, but lost in the first round to up-and-coming Lithuanian Ričardas Berankis. Having not gained any points on his favorite surface, Harrison decided to compete in the 2010 Hall of Fame Tennis Championships. He defeated sixth seed Karol Beck, before defeating seventeen-year-old Denis Kudla. He then lost to Richard Bloomfield of Great Britain.

Harrison qualified for the US Open and defeated the 15th seed Ivan Ljubičić in the first round for his first win in a Grand Slam tournament. In the second round, Harrison fell to Sergey Stakhovsky in a grueling 5-setter, after failing to convert three match points when up 6–3 in the fifth set tiebreak.

He opted to stay in the U.S. instead of heading to Asia and trying to qualify into main tour events. He had a relatively successful fall on the Challenger tour, making the final in Tiburon, the quarterfinals in Calabasas, the second round in Charlottesville, and the second round in Bratislava where he defeated ATP no. 93 Dustin Brown.

2011: Top 100 debut
Harrison lost to Adrian Mannarino in straight sets in the first round of the 2011 Australian Open.

Harrison won the 2011 Honolulu Challenger, beating Alex Kuznetsov in the final. He won the doubles title as well. He ousted 22nd-seeded Guillermo García-López in the second round of the 2011 BNP Paribas Open at Indian Wells, California, as a wild card. In the third round, he defeated Canadian up-and-comer Milos Raonic in a tight three-setter to set up a fourth-round confrontation with world no. 3 Roger Federer, which Harrison lost.

At the 2011 French Open, Robin Söderling (seeded fifth) beat Harrison, but the young American was able to take a set off the two-time French Open finalist. His next tournament was Queen's in London, where he was given a wild card. However, he lost in the first round to Michael Berrer in three close sets, 6–7, 6–2, 5–7. He then competed in the qualifying competition for Wimbledon, in which he reached the final round but lost in five sets to Cedrik-Marcel Stebe. He, however, received a spot in the main Wimbledon draw as a lucky loser. He beat Ivan Dodig in the first round. He faced seventh seed David Ferrer in the second round, losing in a five-set match that lasted two days.

With partner Matthew Ebden, he won the doubles tournament at the 2011 Campbell's Hall of Fame Tennis Championships in July. Harrison made his first ATP semifinal in Atlanta, where he lost to eventual champion Mardy Fish. This performance shot him into the top 100 for the first time, at no. 94. He followed this by another semifinal appearance in Los Angeles just the week after where Fish once again stopped him in three sets. As a result, his ranking jumped to world no. 82. His next tournament was Washington, D.C., where he lost to Viktor Troicki in the second round. He was also granted a wildcard to participate in the Cincinnati Masters. He lost to Novak Djokovic (no. 1 in the world) in the second round. By year's end, he had scored wins over Victor Hanescu and Troicki, and he had risen to no. 79 in the world rankings.

2012
During the Australian summer, Harrison lost in the first and second rounds of Brisbane and Auckland, respectively. At the Australian Open, he lost in the first round to world no. 4 Andy Murray, after taking the first set.

In February, Harrison made his third appearance in the semifinals in San Jose, where he lost to eventual winner Milos Raonic.

In April, Harrison lost his inaugural Davis Cup matches to France's Jo Wilfried Tsonga and Gilles Simon. Despite Harrison's two losses, the U.S. still advanced to the semifinals, where the team faced Spain in September 2012 and lost.

Harrison played for the Philadelphia Freedoms of World Team Tennis in the summer as their 2012 wild-card player. It was his first season playing for WTT. Harrison played with the Freedoms in their home matches on July 11 and 14 at The Pavilion at Villanova University, and traveled with the team to face the New York Sportimes on July 13.

Harrison lost to Novak Djokovic in straight sets in the second round of the 2012 Wimbledon Championships.

Harrison participated in singles at the 2012 Summer Olympics. He lost in the first round to Santiago Giraldo of Colombia. An article in The New York Times made more note of his behavior than his tennis, reporting: "Though the match was considered winnable for Harrison, the loss itself will be less remembered than Harrison’s petulant behavior as the match slipped away."

2013

Harrison started off the year strong with a victory over John Isner at the Apia International Sydney. At the Australian Open he beat Santiago Giraldo before only winning six games against Novak Djokovic. Harrison won his first match at the French Open against Andrey Kuznetsov. Harrison reached the semifinals of the BB&T Atlanta Open, where he lost at the hands of Kevin Anderson.

2014
Harrison had a frustrating year in 2014. After qualifying in Brisbane and Sydney, he exited in the first round of both tournaments at the hands of Sam Groth and Nicolas Mahut, respectively. He entered the main draw directly at the Australian Open, but again went down in the first round, this time to Gaël Monfils.

He then played a couple of Challenger events, but failed to advance beyond the second round even there. In Memphis and Delray Beach, he made it to the second round with victories over Björn Phau and Yen-Hsun Lu, but then lost to Alex Bogomolov Jr. and Marin Čilić.

Harrison made the second round in Indian Wells and Miami with victories over Andrey Golubev and Federico Delbonis and reached the quarterfinals of a Challenger event in March, as well. However, he failed to qualify in Madrid and the French Open.

He did not qualify at the Queen's Club, but he did qualify at Wimbledon, only to make another first-round exit at the hands of Grigor Dimitrov.  He then went down in the first round in Newport, Rhode Island and Atlanta at the hands of eventual champion Lleyton Hewitt in Newport and fellow American Tim Smyczek in Atlanta. Consequently, Harrison's ranking plummeted to no. 190.

2015

Harrison won the Happy Valley Challenger after defeating Marcos Baghdatis in the final. At the 2015 Abierto Mexicano Telcel, he received a spot in qualifying as an alternative. He defeated Adrián Menéndez Maceiras in straight sets, before qualifying to beat countryman Michael Russell in straight sets. In the first round, Harrison defeated another countryman Donald Young, after Young retired in the third set. In the second round, Harrison scored a huge upset as he took down his first top-ten opponent Grigor Dimitrov. Harrison continued his run as he defeated Croatian Ivo Karlović in the quarterfinals. Harrison eventually lost to Spaniard David Ferrer in three sets in the semifinals. Harrison scored 200 ATP points in Acapulco, which rocketed his ranking up from 169 to 109. At the 2015 Cincinnati Masters, he lost to Thanasi Kokkinakis in the qualifying round.

2016: Resurgence
Harrison began his resurgence in the summer by reaching the round of 16 in both the Citi Open, an ATP 500 event, and the Rogers Cup in Toronto, an ATP 1000 Masters event. At the US Open, he achieved the biggest win of his career by knocking off 5th-seeded Milos Raonic to reach the 3rd round of a grand slam for the first time ever. With this run, he returned to the Top 100 for the first time in several years.

Playing for the San Diego Aviators, Harrison was named 2016 World TeamTennis Male Most Valuable Player. He led the league in winning percentage in men's singles and was also second in men's doubles behind teammate Raven Klaasen. The 2016 Aviators won the King Trophy as WTT champions.

2017: Maiden ATP title, French Open doubles title, top 40 debut

Harrison won his first match at the Australian Open over Frenchman Nicolas Mahut 6–3, 6–4, 6–2, marking the first time he made the second round at the tournament since 2013. He then fell in straight sets to Tomáš Berdych.

Harrison reached the final of the RBC Tennis Championships of Dallas and defeated Taylor Fritz in straight sets, winning his fourth Challenger title. In his next tournament, Harrison followed up on that success by reaching both the singles and doubles finals at the Memphis Open. This was his first singles final, having lost in the semifinals on seven previous occasions. Although he would lose the doubles final with Steve Johnson, Harrison defeated Nikoloz Basilashvili in the singles final to win his first career title. Between his back-to-back titles at the RBC Tennis Championships of Dallas and the Memphis Open, he did not drop a set at either tournament.

At the French Open, Harrison teamed with Michael Venus to win the men's doubles title.

Harrison reached a career-high ranking of No. 40 on 17 July 2017. Two weeks later he made his second final of 2017 at the 2017 Atlanta Open, losing to John Isner.

2018: Two ATP singles and one doubles finals
Harrison started 2018 by making the final of the 2018 Brisbane International before losing to Nick Kyrgios 6–4, 6–2.
He also made the final in 2018 BB&T Atlanta Open losing to John Isner. At the same tournament he reached the doubles final partnering Rajeev Ram.

During competition in the 2018 New York Open, Harrison was charged by competitor Donald Young with making racist comments during their match. After an investigation, the ATP found no evidence that racist comments had been made.

2020-2021: Return to tour, first ATP win since 2019 & doubles final 
He made his return to the tour at the 2020 Delray Beach Open as a wildcard, after being out due to surgery, and won his first match since April 2019 in Houston, defeating Damir Džumhur.

In 2021, he reached the doubles final, also as a wildcard, in Delray Beach, partnering his brother Christian Harrison.

World TeamTennis
Harrison has played three seasons with World TeamTennis, making his debut in 2016 with the San Diego Aviators. He was named the 2016 WTT Male MVP, after recording the highest Men's Singles winning percentage (.608), and the second highest winning percentage in Men's Doubles (.586). He has since played another two seasons for the Aviators (2017-2018).  It was announced he will be joining the San Diego Aviators during the 2020 WTT season set to begin July 12.

Playing style
Harrison relies on an explosive serve and a counterpunching game from the baseline. He is also known for a strong forehand and for having a strong second serve, both in pace and kick.

Significant finals

Grand Slam finals

Doubles: 1 (1 title)

ATP career finals

Singles: 4 (1 title, 3 runners-up)

Doubles: 7 (4 titles, 3 runner-ups)

Performance timelines

Singles
Current through the 2021 Delray Beach Open.

Doubles

Wins over top-10 players

References

External links

 
 
 
 

1992 births
Living people
Sportspeople from Shreveport, Louisiana
American male tennis players
People from Austin, Texas
Tennis people from Louisiana
Tennis people from Texas
Tennis players at the 2012 Summer Olympics
Olympic tennis players of the United States
French Open champions
Grand Slam (tennis) champions in men's doubles